Brovko is a Slavic surname. Notable people with the surname include:

 Anatoly Brovko (born 1966), Russian politician
 Eduard Brovko (1936–1998), Soviet weightlifter
 Fyodor Brovko (1904–1960), Soviet and Moldavian politician
 Ihor Brovko (born 1992), Ukrainian football midfielder

Slavic-language surnames